Harvey Wijngaarde (born 23 January 1981) is a Dutch former professional footballer who made his Eredivisie league debut with club SC Heerenveen during the 2000–01 season. He also played for club MVV Maastricht during the 2001–03 season.

References

External links
voetbal international profile

1981 births
Living people
Association football defenders
Dutch footballers
Footballers from Rotterdam
SC Heerenveen players
MVV Maastricht players
Eredivisie players
Eerste Divisie players